Opera comique may also refer to:

 Opéra comique, a genre of French opera
 Opéra-Comique, a Parisian opera company
 Opera Comique, theatre in London
 Opera Comique (Oslo), a Norwegian opera company